Bicholim is an administrative region of Goa, India.

External links
Cities and villages in Bicholim Taluk

Taluks of Goa
Geography of North Goa district